Space Shuttle Discovery (Orbiter Vehicle Designation: OV-103) is a retired American spacecraft. The spaceplane was one of the orbiters from NASA's Space Shuttle program and the third of five fully operational orbiters to be built. Its first mission, STS-41-D, flew from August 30 to September 5, 1984. Over 27 years of service it launched and landed 39 times, aggregating more spaceflights than any other spacecraft to date. The Space Shuttle launch vehicle had three main components: the Space Shuttle orbiter, a single-use central fuel tank, and two reusable solid rocket boosters. Nearly 25,000 heat-resistant tiles cover the orbiter to protect it from high temperatures on re-entry.

Discovery became the third operational orbiter to enter service, preceded by Columbia and Challenger. It embarked on its final mission, STS-133, on February 24, 2011, and touched down for the last time at Kennedy Space Center on March 9, having spent a cumulative total of nearly a full year in space. Discovery performed both research and International Space Station (ISS) assembly missions, and also carried the Hubble Space Telescope into orbit among other satellites. 
 
Discovery was the first operational shuttle to be retired, followed by Endeavour and then Atlantis. The shuttle is now on display at the Steven F. Udvar-Hazy Center of the Smithsonian National Air and Space Museum.

History
The name Discovery was chosen to carry on a tradition based on ships of exploration, primarily , one of the ships commanded by Captain James Cook during his third and final major voyage from 1776 to 1779, and Henry Hudson's , which was used in 1610–1611 to explore Hudson Bay and search for a Northwest Passage.

Space Shuttle Discovery launched the Hubble Space Telescope and conducted the second and third Hubble service missions. It also launched the Ulysses probe and three TDRS satellites. Twice Discovery was chosen as the "Return To Flight" Orbiter, first in 1988 after the loss of Challenger in 1986, and then again for the twin "Return To Flight" missions in July 2005 and July 2006 after the Columbia disaster in 2003. Project Mercury astronaut John Glenn, who was 77 at the time, flew with Discovery on STS-95 in 1998, making him the oldest person to go into space at that time in history.

Had plans to launch United States Department of Defense payloads from Vandenberg Air Force Base gone ahead, Discovery would have become the dedicated US Air Force shuttle. Its first West Coast mission, STS-62-A, was scheduled for 1986, but canceled in the aftermath of the Challenger disaster.

Discovery was retired after completing its final mission, STS-133 on March 9, 2011. The spacecraft is now on display in Virginia at the Steven F. Udvar-Hazy Center, an annex of the Smithsonian Institution's National Air and Space Museum.

Construction milestones

Features and upgrades 

During its construction, Discovery was fitted with several black tiles near the middle starboard window where there should have been white tiles. It is unknown if this was the result of a harmless manufacturing mishap or done intentionally to give a distinctive look to the shuttle. This feature has been called 'teardrop' and allowed Discovery to be told apart from the rest of the fleet without looking at its name, although often unnoticed by the uninitiated.

The spacecraft weighed roughly  less than Columbia when it was brought into service due to optimalizations determined during the construction and testing of Enterprise, Columbia and Challenger. Discovery weighs  heavier than Atlantis and  heavier than Endeavour after further weight-saving adjustments were made.

Part of the Discovery weight optimizations included the greater use of quilted AFRSI blankets rather than the white LRSI tiles on the fuselage, and the use of graphite epoxy instead of aluminum for the payload bay doors and some of the wing spars and beams.

Upon its delivery to the Kennedy Space Center in 1983, Discovery was modified alongside Challenger to accommodate the liquid-fueled Centaur-G booster, which had been planned for use beginning in 1986 but was cancelled in the wake of the Challenger disaster.

Beginning in late 1995, the orbiter underwent a nine-month Orbiter Maintenance Down Period (OMDP) in Palmdale, California. This included outfitting the vehicle with a 5th set of cryogenic tanks and an external airlock to support missions to the International Space Station. As with all the orbiters, it could be attached to the top of specialized aircraft and did so in June 1996 when it returned to the Kennedy Space Center, and later in April 2012 when sent to the Udvar-Hazy Center, riding piggy-back on a modified Boeing 747.

After STS-105, Discovery became the first of the orbiter fleet to undergo Orbiter Major Modification (OMM) period at the Kennedy Space Center. Work began in September 2002 to prepare the vehicle for Return to Flight. The work included scheduled upgrades and additional safety modifications.

Decommissioning and display

Discovery was decommissioned on March 9, 2011.

NASA offered Discovery to the Smithsonian Institution's National Air and Space Museum for public display and preservation, after a month-long decontamination process, as part of the national collection. Discovery replaced  in the Smithsonian's display at the Steven F. Udvar-Hazy Center in Virginia. Discovery was transported to Washington Dulles International Airport on April 17, 2012, and was transferred to the Udvar-Hazy on April 19 where a welcome ceremony was held. Afterwards, at around 5:30 pm, Discovery was rolled to its "final wheels stop" in the Udvar Hazy Center.

Flights

By its last mission, Discovery had flown 149 million miles (238 million km) in 39 missions, completed 5,830 orbits, and spent 365 days in orbit over 27 years. Discovery flew more flights than any other Orbiter Shuttle, including four in 1985 alone. Discovery flew both "return to flight" missions after the Challenger and Columbia disasters: STS-26 in 1988, STS-114 in 2005, and STS-121 in 2006. Discovery flew the ante-penultimate mission of the Space Shuttle program, STS-133, having launched on February 24, 2011. Endeavour flew STS-134 and Atlantis performed STS-135, NASA's last Space Shuttle mission. On February 24, 2011, Space Shuttle Discovery launched from Kennedy Space Center's Launch Complex 39-A to begin its final orbital flight.

Flights listing

‡ Longest shuttle mission for Discovery
 – shortest shuttle mission for Discovery

Mission and tribute insignias

Flow directors
The Flow Director was responsible for the overall preparation of the shuttle for launch and processing it after landing, and remained permanently assigned to head the spacecraft's ground crew while the astronaut flight crews changed for every mission. Each shuttle's Flow Director was supported by a Vehicle Manager for the same spacecraft. Space Shuttle Discovery'''s Flow Directors were:
 Until 01/1991: John J. "Tip" Talone Jr. (afterwards Flow Director for Endeavour)
 01/1991 – 09/1992: John C. "Chris" Fairey
 09/1992 – 10/1996: David A. King
 10/1996 – 05/2000: W. Scott Cilento
 12/2000 – 03/2011: Stephanie S. Stilson

Gallery
{| class="wikitable" style="text-align:center"
|-
|
|
|
|
|
|-
|<small>The launch of STS-41-D, Discovery's first mission.</small>
|STS-121 launched on July 4, 2006 – the only Shuttle to launch on Independence Day.
|STS-119 on the night of March 11, 2009.
|Discovery sits atop a modified Boeing 747 as it touches down.
|Discovery lands after its first flight, STS-41-D.
|-
|
|
|
|
|
|-
|Discovery performing the Rendezvous pitch maneuver prior to docking with the International Space Station.
|The Space Shuttle Discovery soon after landing
|Modified Boeing 747 carrying Discovery.
|STS-124 comes to a close as Discovery lands at the Kennedy Space Center.
|Discoverys final touchdown on Kennedy Space Center's runway, concluding the STS-133 mission and Discoverys 27-year career.
|}

See also

 List of human spaceflights
 List of Space Shuttle crews
 List of Space Shuttle missions
 Timeline of Space Shuttle missions

References

External links

Return to Flight mission STS-114 and STS-121
Shuttle Orbiter Discovery (OV-103) 
Night Launch of the Space Shuttle Discovery
Discovery on Servicing Mission 3A at ESA/Hubble site
Pictures of preparations for a launch of Discovery 
A Space Shuttle's Final Rollout  – slideshow by Life'' magazine
April 16, 2007: Consolidated Launch Manifest: Space Shuttle Flights and ISS Assembly Sequence.
Transition and Retirement: Hi-res spherical panoramas of the processing

Discovery
Discovery
Artifacts in the collection of the Smithsonian Institution
Historic American Engineering Record in Texas
Individual spacecraft in the collection of the Smithsonian Institution
Individual rockets
Individual aircraft